Finnic mythologies are the mythologies of the various Finnic peoples:
Finnish mythology
Estonian mythology
Komi mythology
Mari mythology
Sámi shamanism

See also
 Baltic mythology
 Bear worship
 Dorvyzhy
 Hungarian mythology
 Mastorava
 Proto-Uralic religion
 Rock carvings at Alta

References and notes

 Herman Hofberg, "Lapparnas Hednatro"
 Uno Holmberg, "Lapparnas religion"
 Rafael Karsten, " Samefolkets religion"
 Edgar Reuteskiöld, " De nordiska samernas religion"
 Tatiana Deviatkina, "Some Aspects of Mordvin Mythology". In: Folklore: Electronic Journal of Folklore 17 (2001): 96-106. DOI: doi:10.7592/FEJF2001.17.mordmyth 
 Paasonen (ed.), Mordwinische Volksdichtung (1941).

External links
 Beivve, including many other related topics (e.g. soul dualism of Sami)

 
 
 
Uralic mythology